The U. J. Cleveland House (also known as the Thomas Smith House) is a historic house located at 551 Charles Street in Mobile, Alabama. It is locally significant as an intact Gulf Coast Cottage with an unusual interior plan.

Description and history 
The -story wood-frame structure, on brick piers, was built in 1853 in the Gulf Coast Cottage style. The interior plan of the house is unusual for Mobile, featuring a back hall dining room. The front door leads into a narrow hall, with the staircase running immediately up to the half story.

It was placed on the National Register of Historic Places on May 21, 1993.

References

National Register of Historic Places in Mobile, Alabama
Houses on the National Register of Historic Places in Alabama
Houses in Mobile, Alabama
Houses completed in 1853
Gulf Coast cottage architecture in Alabama